The Bosnian-Herzegovinian Film Festival (BHFF) is an annual event founded in 2003 and held in New York.  This Festival showcases the best of the Bosnian cinematography and also provides a platform for the international exposure for emerging Bosnian filmmakers. It showcases the best of the resurgent film production in Bosnia since the recent war, bringing the simplicity, soulfulness and the perennial dark humor of the Bosnian film to the American audiences. In addition to showcasing the Bosnian production films the festival also includes in their program films by other producers and directors that deal with historical, socio-political and cultural issues of Bosnia and Herzegovina.

Bosnian-Herzegovinian Film Festival is organized by not-for-profit organization the Academy of Bosnia and Herzegovina Inc.

History
The idea for organizing the Bosnian-Herzegovinian Film Festival was first conceived in 2002 among film enthusiasts from the Bosnian-Herzegovinian diaspora in San Francisco and New York City. The late Benjamin Filipović, film director, professor at the Academy of Performing Arts in Sarajevo and president of the Association of Filmmakers of Bosnia and Herzegovina, provided the inspiration for the first film festival.

In 2003, the first edition of the BHFF was held at the Two Boots Pioneer Theatre (the opening screening was the multiple award-winning film Remake directed by Dino Mustafić and written by Zlatko Topčić). The following year, BHFF moved to larger premises at the Anthology Film Archives, known as an international center for the preservation, study, and exhibition of film and video. In 2007, BHFF relocated to Tribeca Cinemas. In 2018, the festival takes place in two theaters SVA Theatre as the main and Anthology Film Archives as the adjunct venue.

Awards
BHFF is a competition based film festival and it awards The Golden Apple award in several categories to eligible films screened at each BHFF.  Since 2006, BHFF has awarded 39 Golden Apples to some of the most outstanding films of the Bosnian film industry or dealing with Bosnia and Herzegovina in their themes. The winning films have been selected from more than 180 films screened at BHFF over the course of 14 years. They have also passed a difficult and rigorous selection process which to date includes a pool of some 400 film titles entered for BHFF screening consideration.
 
The Golden Apple is given to the most outstanding films screened at the BHFF in two categories of awards, the BHFF Audience Award and BHFF Jury Awards

Jury Awards
Since 2012, BHFF awards BHFF Jury Awards to the most outstanding films screened at the BHFF and selected by jury members as most outstanding in its categories. Members of the BHFF Jury are accomplished and recognized members from Bosnian and American cultural, film and art community who have significantly contributed to the Bosnian-Herzegovinian film industry and culture in general. 

BHFF jury awards following honors to the most outstanding films:

BHFF Jury Award for Best Documentary Film
BHFF Jury Award for Best Short or Animated Narrative Film
BHFF Jury Award for Best Feature Narrative Film
BHFF Jury Award for Best Acting Performance
BHFF Jury Special Mention

BHFF awards following Jury awards:

BHFF Jury Award for Best Documentary Film
 2012 A Cell Phone Movie - Nedžad Begović
 2013 Zizi - Nedžad Begović
 2014 Finding Family - Chris Leslie and Oggi Tomic
 2015 Pretty Village - Dave Evans
 2016 I Can Speak - Mirza Skenderagić
 2017 No Smoking in Sarajevo - Gianluca Loffredo
 2018 To Be Far - Samira Kameli and Sajra Subašić
BHFF Jury Award for Best Short Film
 2012 Short for Vernesa B - Jons Vukorep
 2013 Baggage - Danis Tanović
 2014 Mum - Ado Hasanović
 2015 Chicken - Una Gunjak
 2016 Damaged Goods - Nermin Hamzić
 2017 Refugee 532 - Goran Kapetanović
 2018 Great Wall of China - Aleksandra Odic
BHFF Jury Award for Best Feature Film
 2012 Cirkus Columbia - Danis Tanović
 2013 Halima's Path - Arsen Anton Ostojić
 2014 An Episode in the Life of an Iron Picker - Danis Tanović
 2015 The Bridges of Sarajevo - multiple directors
 2016 Tigers - Danis Tanović
 2017 A Good Wife - Mirjana Karanović
 2018 The Frog - Elmir Jukić
Honorable Mentions
2012 The Fuse: or How I Burned Simon Bolivar - Igor Drljaca
2016 Our Everyday Life - Ines Tanovic
BHFF Jury Award for Best Acting Performance
2017 Mirjana Karanović - A Good Wife
2018 Emir Hadžihafizbegović - The Frog

Audience Awards
BHFF Audience Awards were first introduced at BHFF in 2006. For 6 years, BHFF nominated films for the BHFF Audience Awards in Documentary, Short or Feature Film categories. In 2012, BHFF unified these awards into a single award given to a film voted by audience members as the most outstanding in all categories as BHFF Audience Award for Best Picture 

Best Feature Film
2011 - Belvedere''' - Ahmed Imamović
2010 - Storm - Hans Christian Schmid
2009 - AgapE - Slobodan Maksimović
2008 - The Rhythm of Life - Enver Puška
2007 - Grbavica - Jasmila Žbanić
2006 - Go West - Ahmed Imamović
Best Documentary Film
2011 - Much Ado in Mostar - Steve Nemsick
2010 - Sevdah - Marina Andree
2009 - Diagnosis S.B.H. - Enes Zlatar
2008 - Enter the Dragon - Ozren Milharcić
2007 - Carnival - Alen Drljević
2006 - I See You My Friend - Ćazim Dervišević

Since 2012 and after introduction of jury awards BHFF consolidated the audience award into a single award

 BHFF Audience Award for Best Picture
 2012 - Cirkus Columbia - Danis Tanović
 2013 - Halima's Path - Arsen Anton Ostojić
 2014 - Finding Family - Chris Leslie and Oggi Tomić
 2015 - Racket - Admir Buljugić
 2016 - Our Everyday Life - Ines Tanović
 2017 - Death in Sarajevo - Danis Tanović
 2018 - Men Don't Cry'' - Alen Drljević

Noteworthy guests and participants
Zlatko Topčić
Armand Assante
Aleksandar Hemon
Benjamin Filipović
Ines Tanović
Ron Haviv
Danis Tanović
Mirjana Karanović
Alen Drljevic
Emir Hadžihafizbegović 
Ademir Kenović
Aida Begić

References

External links
BHFF Official Website

Film festivals in New York City
Bosnian-American history
European-American culture in New York City